Acrocercops calicella is a moth of the family Gracillariidae. It is known from Australia in the Northern Territory, the southern half of Queensland and New South Wales.

The wingspan is about 8 mm. Adults have a fringe on the trailing edge of each wing. The forewings have a striking pattern of brown and white. The hindwings are a uniform dark brown.

The larvae feed on Eucalyptus species, including Eucalyptus gummifera, Eucalyptus major, Eucalyptus resinifer, Eucalyptus robustus, Eucalyptus salignus and Eucalyptus triantha. They mine the leaves of their host plant.

References

calicella
Moths of Australia
Moths described in 1862